Dario Socci (born 13 April 1988) is an Italian professional boxer.

Boxing career

Amateur boxing career 
Socci's amateur career in Italy numbers 81 matches fought in different weight categories (from 69 to 75 kg) and eight participations at the Italian Boxing Championships. In 2008 Socci decided to start facing the international world of boxing, moving first in Spain and in 2010 in the United States, where he trained at the Gleason's Gym.

Professional boxing career 
In August 2012 Socci had in Long Islang his first match as a professional boxer in the Super-Welterweight class (won by unanimous decision). After the match, Socci arrived at the Morris Park Boxing Club in the Bronx, under the wing of Aaron "Superman" Davis, former WBA middleweight world champion, Lou "Honey Boy" Del Valle former WBA light heavyweight world champion, and Vincenzo Scardino. After a short time spent in Brazil, he moved to Germany, at ISI Boxing Gym in Berlin, where he stayed for a year and a half. Three major championship wins date back to that period: the GBA German International Superwelterweight Title, the GBU European Welterweight Title and the GBU Continental Middleweight Title.

In 2015 he spent a period of training in Japan, in Tokyo, with Master Sendai Tanaka of Teiken Boxing Gym (in 2018 he returned again to Japan, this time to Osaka, to continue his training at MUTO Boxing Gym). In January 2016, Socci started to train at the Pollex Boxing Team boxing gym with Team Pollex boxers. In the same summer, he began collaborating with the Evolve MMA Fighiting Team (with which he still collaborates) spending about two months of 2016 in Singapore as a sparring partner and technical boxing consultant.

From September 2016 until 2018 Socci settled in Mexico in Guadalajara in the Escuela de Boxeo Canelo Alvarez, with the former WBC featherweight world champion Alejandro "La Cobrita" Gonzalez as trainer. During this period he fought many important matches, including the one for the vacant IBF Welterweight Championship, held in South Africa against Tsiko Mulovhedzi, at the time the World Welterweight Champion for the IBO.

In 2018 he returned to Europe, alternating his trainings between Peacock Gym in London, Morris Park in New York, Fortitudo Boxe in Rome, and the Pugilistica Salernitana in his hometown.

On 21 December 2019 at the event organized by Frank Warren at the Copper Boxe Arena in London, he suffered a technical knockout defeat at 01:55 of the last round against the British boxer Troy Williamson, a bout valid for the vacant IBF European Super Welter title

Dario as free agent was the official challenger of Tobia Giuseppe Loriga for the Italian Welterweight Title, which should have been held on March 20, 2020, but which was then postponed to November 13, 2020, in Mantova, due to the SARS-CoV-2 pandemic COVID-19. The match ended on points with a majority (not unanimous) verdict for the reigning champion, who fought at the home of his managers and promoters Loreni and Ventura, with the three judges assigning the following score: 96–94, 96–94, 95-95.

In January 2021 he signed a contract for three matches with BBT-Buccioni Boxing Team and officially becomes a boxer of Italian Manager-Entrepreneur from Rome Davide Buccioni.

After a return match in March after an elbow injury, in December 2021 in the province of Salerno disputes the International UBC (Universal Boxing Council) middleweight Title against Georgian, Giorgi Umekashvili (6-0-0), winning by unanimous verdict to the points.

In March 2022 in Berlin in Germany, he again disputes the Intercontinental IBF but this time in the middleweight against the unbeaten Italian-German Vincenzo Gualtieri 18 (7KO) -0-1, who loses on points with a unanimous decision but playing a hard-fought match . At the end of the match Socci after the verdict, live on television, asks for the hand of his current partner Anita who had accompanied him to the corner.

Other Activities 

He was one of the owners of the Fortitudo Boxe Roma gym together with one of his coaches, Giorgio Maccaroni, and others partners. Always with Maccaroni, and anothers partners was the owners of the "Primo Bistro" small restaurant business in the heart of the San Giovanni district of Rome, Italy.

Private life 

In the first half of 2021, Socci begins a relationship with the Italian showgirl Paola Caruso known above all for the role of Bonas in "Avanti Un Altro". One of his most recent adventures was her participation in "Isola dei Famosi 11", lasted a few months.
He is currently engaged to Anita Sommella, a doctor he met during a post-injury rehabilitation program, to which he asked her to marry him at the end of the match against Vincenzo Gualtieri in Berlin in 2022.

Boxing records

Titles 
 2014 Champion GBA German International Super Welterweight Title
 2015 Champion GBU European Welterweight Title
 2015 Champion GBU Continental Middleweight Title
 2021 Champion UBC International Middleweight Title

Professional record 
 Wins: 15
 Wins K.O.: 6
 Defeats: 7
 Defeats K.O.: 1 (TKO)
 Draws: 2
 No-Contest: 1
 Total matches: 25
 Rounds: 166
 KOs: 24%

References

External links 
 Official website of Dario Socci The Italian Trouble
Article on Dario Socci,on Salerno Notizie, salernonotizie.it
Article on Dario Socci on Salerno in Web, salernoinweb.it
 on Dario Socci on Corriere dello sport, corrieredellosport.it
 on Dario Socci on Leggo, leggo.it
 on Dario Socci on tgcom24, tgcom24.mediaset.it

1988 births
Living people
Italian male boxers
Welterweight boxers
Light-middleweight boxers
Sportspeople from the Province of Salerno